Eight Rounds Rapid are a British four-piece punk/R&B band from Southend, Essex, England. The band was formed in 2010 by drummer Lee Watkins and vocalist David Alexander (David Burke), with guitarist Simon Johnson; they were joined in 2012 by bassist Jules Cooper. The band released their first video Stalker in 2011, followed by Channel Swimmer in 2012 and Talent in 2013, the same year as their debut 7" single Writeabout/Steve, released on Podrophenia Records. All appeared on their well-received debut album Lossleader,  issued in 2014 by Cadiz Music, bringing the group comparisons to Alternative TV and Wire as well as various pub rock bands.

The band gained radio support from Tom Robinson, Gary Crowley, and Mark Radcliffe and further positive reviews including ones from Uncut, Mojo, and Classic Rock.

Eight Rounds Rapid toured supporting Wilko Johnson in 2013 and again in 2015.

Their second album Object D’Art was released in 2017, previewed by a new video for "I Like It" starring Ewen MacIntosh.

The band's third studio album was released in August 2020 on Hamburg label Tapete Records, to further critical acclaim. Narc magazine called it "Witty, caustic, clever, so catchy.. a bittersweet love letter from an outpost in the pandemic provinces."

Discography

Albums
Lossleader, CD, 2014
Object D'Art, LP/CD/DL, 2017
Love Your Work, LP/CD/DL, 2020

Singles
"Writeabout" / "Steve", 7", 2013

Compilation appearances
"Channel Swimmer", Under the Gun, Vive Le Rock, 2014
"Bully Boy", Dirty Mod, Well Suspect, 2016

References

External links
Official Eight Rounds Rapid website
Discogs entry
2015 interview

English punk rock groups
Punk blues musical groups
English blues rock musical groups
British pub rock music groups
Music in Southend-on-Sea
British rhythm and blues musical groups
Musical groups established in 2010
Musical groups from Essex
2010 establishments in England